Malaysian Sikh community is known to be the fourth largest Malaysian Indian ethnic group. It is estimated that there are around 100,000 Sikhs in Malaysia.

Early Sikh pioneers
Sikhs were initially sent to British Malaya as political prisoners. The first few Sikhs to set foot in Malaya were Nihal Singh (better known as Bhai Maharaj Singh) and Kharak Singh, who were deported from India due to anti-British involvement in 1849. These prisoners were sent to the Outram Road prison in what is now Singapore. In 1865, Sikhs were sent to Malaysia again as recruits in the armed forces in the British Empire mainly as police, military and guards.

Sikh Community and migration 
Regular Sikh migration to Malaya (Malaysia) started here in 1873. The Sikh community is the largest here among Southeast and East Asia. The earliest Sikhs settlers were Policemen. The first Sikh Gurdwara was set up in Cornwallis in 1873 inside police Lines. The first public Sikh Gurdwara was set up in 1903 in Penang. Sikhs occupied top positions in Military and Police during the British rule of Malaysia. There are as many as 15 Sikh Gurdwaras in Kuala Lumpur alone more than the number of mosques there, despite Muslims being the dominant demographic in Kuala Lumpur. Malaysian Sikhs are deep-rooted in Sikh culture more than Sikh diaspora anywhere in the world and are assimilated in mainstream keeping their identity intact.
A group of Sikh businessmen in Malaysia has set up a network of International Sikh Entrepreneurs (NISE) to promote their products and services and generate opportunities among members.

Gurdwaras in Malaysia

There are a total of 119 gurdwaras throughout Malaysia. 42 of them are situated in the state of Perak, where the majority of Sikhs in Malaysia resides.

Johor
Gurdwara Sahib Muar, Johor
Gurdwara Sahib Batu Pahat, Johor
Gurdwara Sahib Segamat, Johor
Gurdwara Sahib Babe ke Guru Ram Das World, Machap, Johor
Gurdwara Sahib Kluang, Johor
Gurdwara Sahib Pontian, Johor
Gurdwara Sahib Johor Bahru, Johor
Kuala Lumpur
Gurdwara Sahib Dharamsala, Kuala Lumpur
Wadda Gurdwara Sahib Jalan Kampung, Kuala Lumpur
Gurdwara Sahib Jalan Sungai Besi, Kuala Lumpur
Gurdwara Sahib Jinjang, Kuala Lumpur
Gurdwara Sahib Kampung Pandan Settlement, Kuala Lumpur
Gurdwara Sahib Kuyow, Kuala Lumpur
Gurdwara Sahib Mainduab, Kuala Lumpur
Gurdwara Sahib Police, Kuala Lumpur 
Gurdwara Sahib Police Depot, Kuala Lumpur
Gurdwara Sahib Police Jalan Parliament, Kuala Lumpur
Gurdwara Sahib Central Workshops Sentul, Kuala Lumpur
Gurdwara Nanak Darbar Tatt Khalsa, Kuala Lumpur, Malaysia
Gurdwara Sahib, Titiwangsa Kuala Lumpur, Malaysia
Gurdwara Sahib Majha Diwan Malaya
Labuan
Gurdwara Sahib Labuan 
Kedah
Gurdwara Sahib Kulim,Kedah
Gurdwara Sahib Sungei Petani, Kedah
Gurdwara Sahib Alor Star, Kedah
Kelantan
Gurdwara Sahib Tumpat, Kelantan
Gurdwara Sahib Kota Bahru, Kelantan
Gurdwara Sahib Kuala Krai, Kelantan
Malacca
Gurdwara Sahib Malacca
Negeri Sembilan
Gurdwara Sahib Mantin, Negeri Sembilan
Gurdwara Sahib Kuala Klavang, Jelebu, Negeri Sembilan
Gurdwara Sahib Port Dickson, Negeri Sembilan
Gurdwara Sahib Seremban, Negeri Sembilan
Gurdwara Sahib Kuala Pilah, Negeri Sembilan
Gurdwara Sahib Tampin, Negeri Sembilan
Pahang
Gurdwara Sahib Brinchang, Cameron Highlands, Pahang
Gurdwara Sahib Bentong, Pahang
Gurdwara Sahib Kuala Lipis, Pahang
Gurdwara Sahib Tanah Rata, Pahang
Gurdwara Sahib Raub, Pahang
Gurdwara Sahib Mentakab, Pahang
Gurdwara Sahib (Sikh Temple), Kuantan
Penang
Gurdwara Sahib Khalsa Dharmak Jatha, Penang
Gurdwara Sahib Sikh Police, Penang
Wadda Gurdwara Sahib, Penang
Gurdwara Sahib Perai, Penang
Gurdwara Sahib Butterworth, Penang
Gurdwara Sahib Bukit Mertajam, Penang
Perak
Gurdwara Sahib Khalsa Dharmik Sabha, Parit Buntar, Perak
Gurdwara Sahib Pokok Assam, Taiping, Perak
Gurdwara Sahib Taiping, Perak
Gurdwara Sahib Sitiawan, Perak
Gurdwara Sahib Sungei Siput Utara, Perak
Gurdwara Sahib Chemor, Perak
Gurdwara Sahib Kampong Kepayang, Ipoh, Perak
Gurdwara Sahib Tanjong Rambutan, Perak
Gurdwara Sahib Kuala Kangsar, Perak
Gurdwara Shaheed Ganj Sahib, Kaniunting, Perak
Gurdwara Sahib Bruas, Perak
Gurdwara Sahib Bagan Serai, Perak
Gurdwara Sahib Jelapang, Ipoh, Perak
Gurdwara Sahib Sikh Dharmak Sabha, Ipoh, Perak
Gurdwara Sahib Gunong Rapat, Ipoh, Perak
Gurdwara Sahib Buntong, Ipoh, Perak
Gurdwara Sahib Tambun, Ipoh, Perak
Gurdwara Sahib Menglembu Regrouping Area, Ipoh, Perak
Gurdwara Sahib Lahat, Ipoh, Perak
Gurdwara Sahib Gopeng, Perak
Gurdwara Sahib Malim Nawar, Perak
Gurdwara Sahib Tanjong Tuallang, Perak
Gurdwara Sahib Changkat Tin, Perak
Gurdwara Sahib Ayer Papan, Perak
Gurdwara Sahib Tronoh, Perak
Gurdwara Sahib Pusing, Perak
Gurdwara Sahib Siputeh, Ipoh, Perak
Gurdwara Sahib Menglembu, Jalan Lahat, Ipoh, Perak
Gurdwara Sahib Bercham, Ipoh, Perak
Gurdwara Sahib Greentown, Ipoh, Perak
Gurdwara Sahib Kampar, Perak
Gurdwara Sahib Teluk Intan, Perak
Gurdwara Sahib Slim River, Perak
Gurdwara Sahib Changkat, Batu Gajah, Perak
Gurdwara Sahib Batu Gujah, Perak
Gurdwara Sahib Sri Guru Singh Sabha, Gopeng, Perak
Gurdwara Sahib Malay States Guide, Taiping, Perak
Gurdwara Sahib Police, Ipoh, Perak
Gurdwara Sahib Tanjong Malim, Perak
Gurdwara Sahib Bidor, Perak
Gurdwara Sahib Tapah, Perak
Gurdwara Sahib Tronoh Mines, Kampar, Perak
Perlis
Gurdwara Sahib Kangar, Perlis
Sabah
Gurdwara Sahib Singh Sabha, Lahad Datu, Sabah
Gurdwara Sahib Tawau, Sabah
Gurdwara Sahib Kota Kinabalu, Sabah
Gurdwara Sahib Sandakan, Sabah
Sarawak
Gurdwara Sahib Kuching, Sarawak
Gurdwara Sahib Sibu, Sarawak
Gurdwara Sahib Bau, Sarawak
Gurdwara Sahib Miri, Sarawak
Selangor
 Gurdwara Sahib Puchong, Selangor
Gurdwara Sahib Klang
Gurdwara Sahib Kalumpang, Selangor
Gurdwara Sahib Kuala Kubu Baru, Selangor
Gurdwara Sahib Berjuntai Tin, Selangor
Gurdwara Sahib Klang, Selangor
Gurdwara Sahib Shah Alam, Selangor
Gurdwara Sahib Lembah Jaya, Ampang, Selangor
Gurdwara Sahib Kajang, Selangor
Gurdwara Sahib Batu Arang, Selangor 
Gurdwara Sahib Ampang, Selangor
Gurdwara Sahib Guru Ram Das, Banting, Selangor
Gurdwara Sahib Bukit Beruntung, Selangor
 Gurdwara Sahib Petaling Jaya
 Gurdwara Sahib Rawang
 Gurdwara Sahib Bandar Sunway
 Gurdwara Sahib Nanaksar, Serendah

Controversy

In 2017, a teaching module published by a leading Malaysian university (Universiti Teknologi Malaysia, UTM) depicted Hindus in India as unclean and dirty in a slide. Another slide aimed at teaching the origins of Sikhism claimed that founder Guru Nanak had a poor understanding of Islam and had combined it with his surrounding Hindu lifestyle in forming the early foundation of the Sikh faith. A police report was lodged by the chairman of the Hindu Dharma Association of Malaysia in Sungai Petani district against UTM. Malaysia's Minister of Health, Deputy Minister of Education and others had condemned this incident. Due to these condemnations, UTM was forced to apologize.

See also 
 Jainism in Southeast Asia
 Hinduism in Southeast Asia

References

External links
Pertubuhan Belia Sikh Malaysia - Sikh Naujawan Sabha Malaysia